Crisis Response Operations in NATO Operating Systems (CRONOS) is a system of interconnected computer networks used by NATO to transmit classified information. It provides NATO Secret level operations, with access to NATO intelligence applications and databases. As of 1999, a wide area network of NT computers used in NATO in Europe. 
CRONOS provides e-mail, the Microsoft Office Suite, etc. 
It provides informal messaging (e-mail) and information sharing within the NATO community. 
There is no connectivity between CRONOS and any US network or with the coalition wide area network.

See also
 SIPRNet – U.S. Secret Internet Protocol Router Network
 RIPR – U.S. / Korea Coalition Network
 UK Networks
 Joint Operational Command System (JOCS)
 Defence Information Infrastructure
 Foreign and Commonwealth Office's (FCO) FIRECREST

References

External links 
  Newsletter for Information Assurance Technology Professionals, Spring 1999

NATO
Wide area networks
Military communications